Abendroth is a German surname (from German Abendrot, "evening red", "afterglow"). Notable people with the surname include:

 Amandus Augustus Abendroth (1767–1842), German jurist
 August Abendroth (1796–1867), Hamburg jurist, merchant and philanthropist
 Erna von Abendroth (1887–1959), pioneering German nurse and trainer/teacher
 Ernst K. Abendroth, American biologist who researched in Antarctica
 Abendroth Peak a mountain in Antarctica named after Ernst K. Abendroth
 Heide Göttner-Abendroth (born 1941), German feminist
 Hermann Abendroth (1883–1956), German conductor
 Irene Abendroth (1871–1932), Polish soprano
 Martin Abendroth (1883–1977), German opera singer and voice teacher
 Walter Abendroth (1896–1973), German composer
 William H. Abendroth (1895–1970), United States Army Major General
 Wolfgang Abendroth (1906–1985), German jurist

See also 
 Abendrot (album), a studio album by American emo band, You Blew It!
 Abendroth & Root Manufacturing Co, American manufacturer
 "Im Abendrot", the last poem of Four Last Songs

References 

German-language surnames

de:Abendroth